For the star called Rán, see Epsilon Eridani.

In Norse mythology, Rán is a goddess and a personification of the sea. Rán and her husband Ægir, a jötunn who also personifies the sea, have nine daughters, who personify waves. The goddess is frequently associated with a net, which she uses to capture sea-goers. According to the prose introduction to a poem in the Poetic Edda and in Völsunga saga, Rán once loaned her net to the god Loki.

Rán is attested in the Poetic Edda, compiled during the 13th century from earlier traditional sources; the Prose Edda, written during the 13th century by Snorri Sturluson; in both Völsunga saga and Friðþjófs saga hins frœkna; and in the poetry of skalds, such as Sonatorrek, a 10th-century poem by Icelandic skald Egill Skallagrímsson.

Etymology
The Old Norse common noun rán means 'plundering' or 'theft, robbery'. In turn, scholars view the theonym Rán as meaning, for example, 'theft, robbery'. On the etymology of the theonym, scholar Rudolf Simek says, "although the meaning of the name has not been fully clarified, Rán was probably understood as being 'robber' ... and has nothing to do with [Old Norse] ráða 'rule'.

Because Rán is a personification of the sea, skalds employ her name in a variety of kennings to refer to the sea. Examples include Ránar-land ('Ran's land'), -salr ('Rán's hall'), and -vegr ('Rán's way'), and rán-beðr ('the bed of Rán') and meaning 'the bed of the sea'.

Attestations

Sonatorrek
Rán and Ægir receive mention in the poem Sonatorrek attributed to 10th century Icelandic skald Egill Skallagrímsson. In the poem, Egill laments the death of his son Böðvar, who drowned at sea during a storm:

In one difficult stanza later in the poem, the skald expresses the pain of losing his son by invoking the image of slaying the personified sea, personified as Ægir (Old Norse ǫlsmið[r] 'ale-smith') and Rán (Ægis man 'Ægir's wife'):

Poetic Edda

Rán receives three mentions in the Poetic Edda; twice in poetry and once in prose. The first mention occurs in a stanza in Helgakviða Hundingsbana I, when the valkyrie Sigrún assists the ship of the hero Helgi Hundingsbane as it encounters ferocious waters:

In the notes for her translation, Larrington says that Rán "seeks to catch and drown men in her net" and that "to give someone to the sea-goddess is to drown them."

The second instance occurs in a stanza found in Helgakviða Hjörvarðssonar. In this stanza, the hero Atli references Rán while flyting with Hrímgerðr, a female jötunn:

Finally, in the prose introduction to Reginsmál, Loki visits Rán (here rendered as Ron) to borrow her net:
[Odin and Hœnir] sent Loki to get the gold; he went to Ron and got her net, and went then to Andvari's fall and cast the net in front of the pike, and the pike leaped into the net.

Translator Henry Adams Bellows notes how this version of the narrative differs from how it appears in other sources, where Loki catches the pike with his own hands.

Prose Edda

The Prose Edda sections Skáldskaparmál and Háttatal contain several references to Rán. Section 25 of Skáldskaparmál ("How shall sea be referred to?") manners in which poets may refer to the sea, including "husband of Ran" and "land of Ran and of Ægir's daughters", but also "father of Ægir's daughters".

In the same section, the author cites a fragment of a work by the 11th century Icelandic skald Hofgarða-Refr Gestsson, where Rán is referred to as 'Gymir's ... völva':

The section's author comments that the stanza "[implies] that they are all the same, Ægir and Hler and Gymir. The author follows with a quote from another stanza by the skald that references Rán:
But sea-crest-Sleipnir [ship], spray-driven, tears his breast, covered with red paint, out of white Ran's mouth [the sea's grasp].

Chapter 33 of Skáldskaparmál discusses why skalds may refer to gold as "Ægir's fire". The section traces the kenning to a narrative surrounding Ægir, in which the jötunn employs "glowing gold" in the center of his hall to light it "like fire" (which the narrator compares to flaming swords in Valhalla). The section explains that "Ran is the name of Ægir's wife, and the names of their nine daughters are as was written above ... Then the Æsir discovered that Ran had a net in which she caught everyone that went to sea ... so this is the story of the origin of gold being called fire or light or brightness of Ægir, Ran or Ægir's daughters, and from such kennings the practice has now developed of calling gold fire of the sea and of all terms for it, since Ægir and Ran's names are also terms for the sea, and hence gold is now called fire of lakes or rivers and of all river-names."

In the Nafnaþulur section of Skáldskaparmál, Rán appears in a list of goddesses (Old Norse ásynjur).

Völsunga saga and Friðþjófs saga hins frœkna
Rán receives a single mention in Völsunga saga. Like in the prose introduction to the eddic poem Reginsmál (discussed above), "they sent Loki to obtain the gold. He went to Ran and got her net."

In the legendary saga Friðþjófs saga hins frœkna, Friðþjófr and his men find themselves in a violent storm, and the protagonist mourns that he will soon rest in Rán's bed:

The protagonist then decides that as they are to "go to Rán" (at til Ránar skal fara) they would better do so in style with gold on each man. He divides the gold and talks of her again:

Scholarly reception and interpretation
According to Rudolf Simek, "... Rán is the ruler of the realm of the dead at the bottom of the sea to which people who have drowned go." Simek says that "while Ægir personifies the sea as a friendly power, Rán embodies the sinister side of the sea, at least in the eyes of the late Viking Age Icelandic seafarers."

See also
Sessrúmnir, the hall of the goddess Freyja, which may have been conceived of as a ship

Notes

References

 Byock, Jesse. 1990. Trans. The Saga of the Volsungs. University of California Press. 
 Bjarni Einarsson (ed.), Egils saga (London: Viking Society for Northern Research, 2003), 
 Kershaw, Nora. 1922. Trans. Anglo-Saxon and Old Norse Poems. Cambridge at the University Press.
 Eiríkr Magnússon and Morris, William. Trans. 1875. Three Northern Love Stories and Other Tales. Ellis & White.
 Faulkes, Anthony (Trans.). 1995 [1989]. Trans. Edda. Everyman. 
 Faulkes, Anthony. (Editor). 1998. Trans. Edda: Skáldskaparmál. I. Viking Society for Northern Research.
 Gudbrandur Vigfusson. 1874. Trans. An Icelandic-English Dictionary: Based on the Ms. Collections of the Late Richard Cleasby. Clarendon Press.
 Bellows, Henry Adams. 1936. Trans. The Poetic Edda. Princeton University Press. New York: The American-Scandinavian Foundation.
 Larrington, Carolyne (Trans.). 1999 [1996]. Trans. The Poetic Edda. Oxford World's Classics. 
 Simek, Rudolf. 2007 [1993]. Translated by Angela Hall. Dictionary of Northern Mythology. D.S. Brewer. 

Ásynjur
Sea and river goddesses
Death goddesses
Norse underworld
Personifications in Norse mythology
el:Ραν
ko:란